The National Service (Armed Forces) Act 1939 was enacted by the Parliament of the United Kingdom on 3 September 1939, the day the United Kingdom declared war on Germany at the start of the Second World War. It superseded the Military Training Act 1939 (enacted in May of that year) and enforced full conscription on all male British subjects between 18 and 41 who were present in Great Britain, subject to certain exemptions. By a royal declaration in January 1941, the term Great Britain was extended to include the Isle of Man.

Despite the end of the war in September 1945, the Labour government kept the Act in force until 1948, when its impacts were continued in a modified form by the enactment of the National Service Act 1948.

Exemptions 
Medically unfit as well as the blind, disabled, and those with mental disorders
British subjects from outside Britain and the Isle of Man who had lived in the country for less than two years
Students
Persons employed by the government of any country of the British Empire except the United Kingdom
Clergy of any denomination
Married women
Women who had one or more children 14 years old or younger living with them. This included their own children, legitimate or illegitimate, stepchildren, and adopted children, as long as the child was adopted before 18 December 1941. Pregnant women were liable to be called up but in practice were not.
Conscientious objectors
People working in reserved occupations like baking, farming, medicine, and engineering.
As the Act applied only to those who were physically present in Great Britain and the Isle of Man, in effect all those living overseas were also exempt.

See also
Administration of Justice (Emergency Provisions) Act 1939

References

External links
 (Parliamentary documents on National Service)

Conscription in the United Kingdom
Military history of the United Kingdom during World War II
United Kingdom Acts of Parliament 1939
1939 in military history
United Kingdom military law
Conscription law
World War II legislation
September 1939 events